Jeanne Rose (born January 9, 1937) is an herbalist/aromatherapist who changed the practice of American herbalism when she began her public work in 1969 with the publication of her first book, Herbs & Things: Jeanne Rose's Herbal. She began her herbal career in California as an undergraduate with studies in botany and science and a degree from San Jose State College. She went on to graduate work in marine biology and ecology. In 1969, she wrote the first modern book of herbalism, Herbs & Things. She taught herbs and aromatherapy at the University of California Extension throughout the 1970s and privately throughout the United States. She has lived in San Francisco since 1967 and established a herbal/aromatic garden and study center. Becoming concerned about the environment and the production of aromatic plants, she organized the aromatherapy industry and a group, The Aromatic Plant Project,  to  support local and organic production of aromatic plants, to provide resources for growers and distillers, to ensure high quality aromatherapy products and to educate consumers as to the appropriate and beneficial uses of these aromatic products.

Rose is the author of over 20 books, including Herbs & Things, The Herbal Body Book, The Aromatherapy Book and Jeanne Rose's Herbal Guide to Food, and she has taught herbs, aromatherapy and distillation extensively throughout the US. She organized and was president of the first large aromatherapy organization in the United States, NAHA, and speaks widely at many other events and  conferences. She teaches distillation techniques for quality essential oils in various parts of the world. The word, "hydrosol" as used for the waters of distillation, was first used and put in place by Jeanne Rose in 1990.

Works
 Herbs & Things: Jeanne Rose's Herbal, Perigee Books 1972, Last Gasp 2001

References

External links

http://www.organicinfusions.com
http://www.allnaturalbeauty.us/recipies_jeannerose2.htm
http://www.jeannerose.net/author.html
Aromatic Plant Project
Institute of Aromatic Studies
Natural Ingredient Resource Center
Lloyd  Library
Associate Member of The Natural Perfumers Guild

1937 births
Living people
Herbalists
American conservationists